Grass Valley is a valley in the U.S. state of Nevada.

Grass Valley was so named for the grass which covers its floor.

References

Valleys of Eureka County, Nevada
Valleys of Lander County, Nevada